Studio Sessions may refer to:

 Studio Sessions (Headhunterz album), 2010
 Studio Sessions (Grand Slam album), 2002 
 Studio Sessions (Terry Ronald album), 1990